Morizécourt is a commune in the Vosges department in Grand Est in northeastern France.

The Benedictine priory at Morizécourt dates from 1624.

See also
Communes of the Vosges department

References

Communes of Vosges (department)